Günter Bischof (born 6 October 1953 in Mellau, Vorarlberg) is an Austrian-American historian and university professor. A specialist in 20th century diplomatic history, and a graduate of University of New Orleans, Innsbruck University and Harvard University, he currently serves as a Marshall Plan Professor of History at the University of New Orleans. He also serves on the editorial board of the Journal of Austrian-American History.

References 

1953 births
Living people
20th-century Austrian historians
University of Innsbruck alumni
Harvard University alumni
University of New Orleans alumni
University of New Orleans faculty
People from Bregenz District
Members of the European Academy of Sciences and Arts
Austrian emigrants to the United States
21st-century American historians
21st-century American male writers
American male non-fiction writers